MATS University  'Mahaveer Academy of Technology and Science University' , is a private university located in Raipur, Chhattisgarh,  India. It was established by Chhattisgarh Private University Act under Section 2(f) of UGC Act 1956. MATS University is established by the government of C.G. under Chhattisgarh Private Universities establishment & operation act and recognized under section 2(f) of UGC Act 1956 approved by BCI, AICTE, AIU and NCTE and accredited by NAAC. 

MATS University 'Mahaveer Academy of Technology and Science University' began operations in 2006 to empower ambition and equality and responsibility and ethical values as the core foundation of the MATS University AND MATS University leading university in the Chhattisgarh with the most qualified graduates with unparalleled vision to empower ambition and equality and responsibility and ethical values of MATS University.

Constituent Institutes Under University 
 MATS School of Arts 
 MATS School of Business 
 MATS School of Education 
 MATS School of Engineering
 MATS School of Fashion Designing 
 MATS School of Humanities 
 MATS School of Information Technology 
 MATS School of Interior Designing Technology 
 MATS School of Law 
 MATS School of Management 
MATS School of Research 
 MATS School of Science

Departments 
MATS University Departments 

Department of Arts 
 Department of Business 
 Department of Education 
 Department of Engineering 
 Department of Fashion Designing 
 Department of Humanities 
 Department of Information Technology
 Department of Interior Designing Technology
 Department of Law 
 Department of Management
Department of Research 
 Department of Science

Undergraduate programs 
FACULTY OF BUSINESS

 Bachelor of Business Administration 
 Bachelor of Business Commerce 
 Bachelor of Business Management 

FACULTY OF COMPUTER TECHNOLOGY

 Bachelor of Computer Applications 
 Bachelor of Science 
 Bachelor of Technologey 

FACULTY OF EDUCATION

 Bachelor of Education
 Master of Education

FACULTY OF ENGINEERING

 Bachelors of Engineering 
 Master of Engineering 

FACULTY OF JOURNALISM

 Bachelors of Journalism 
 Bachelors of Legal Journalism 

FACULTY OF LAW

 Bachelor of Laws
 Master of Laws

FACULTY OF LEGAL STUDIES

 Bachelor of Political Science
 Bachelor of Police Legal Studies

FACULTY OF RESEARCH

 Doctor of Philosophy (Ph.D).

FACULTY OF SCIENCE

 Bachelor of Science in Fashion Design
 Bachelor of Science in Technology (B.Sc.-FDT)

UNIVERSITY ANNUAL EVENTS 
UNIVERSITY EVENTS

 MATSOTSAV of Aarang campus of Mats University.

References

External links
MATS University Raipur

Education in Raipur, Chhattisgarh
Educational institutions established in 2006
2006 establishments in Chhattisgarh